The Life Extension Institute was an organization formed in the United States in 1913 with the philanthropic goal of prolonging human life through hygiene and disease prevention.  Its organizational officers included many celebrity-philanthropists such as William Howard Taft, Alexander Graham Bell, and Mabel Thorp Boardman but also genuine medical experts including William James Mayo, Russell Henry Chittenden, and J. H. Kellogg and a "Hygiene Reference Board" of dozens of nationally recognized physicians of that era such as Mazÿck Porcher Ravenel and Major General William Crawford Gorgas.

A major project of the institute which fulfilled its mission to disseminate knowledge was publication of the book How to Live, Rules for Healthful Living Based on Modern Science, now in the public domain.

The institute was a proponent of eugenics including sterilization of grossly "unfit" individuals:

See also 
 Life extension

References 

Public health education
Life extension
1913 establishments in the United States
Alexander Graham Bell